Steven Tingay is a John Curtin Distinguished Professor at Curtin University and deputy executive director of the International Centre for Radio Astronomy Research. He is a specialist in radio astronomy  and astrophysics.

References

External links
https://staffportal.curtin.edu.au/staff/profile/view/S.Tingay

Living people
Year of birth missing (living people)
Academic staff of Curtin University
Radio astronomers